Mary Aiken Littauer (February 11, 1912 – December 7, 2005) was a leading authority on ancient domesticated horses and related materials (Brownrigg 2006).  Using her knowledge of contemporary horsemanship, she wrote works on ridden horses and chariots in Greece, the Near East and Egypt.

She was born Mary Aiken Graver in Pittsburgh and raised in New York. She was married to Captain Vladimir S. Littauer, an equestrian whose training and teaching methods are still in use today.

Her family chose the International Museum of the Horse at the Kentucky Horse Park as the recipient of her vast library and her own works on ancient horses.

The museum - a Smithsonian affiliate - has hired an archivist to create an inventory of the hundreds of books.

References

Brownrigg, Gail, 2006, "Obituary - Mary Aiken Littauer," International Council for Archaeozoology Newsletter , 7(1):15.

Equestrian News release, 2007, "World's Most Extensive Private Equine Library Donated to the Kentucky Horse Park," ' American Horse Publications '
http://www.equestrianmag.com/news/equine-library-kentucky-horse-park-4-07.html

Selected bibliography
 1979  Wheeled Vehicles and Ridden Animals in the Ancient Near East, with Joost Crouwel.
 1985  Chariots and Related Equipment from the Tomb of Tutankhamen, with Joost Crouwel.

External links
 International Herald Tribune obituary
 World's Most Extensive Private Equine Library Donated to the Kentucky Horse Park

1912 births
2005 deaths
Writers from Pittsburgh
Equestrian history
Historians from Pennsylvania